Pitch axis may refer to:

In music
 Pitch axis (music), the center about which a melody is inverted
 Pitch axis theory, a musical technique used in constructing chord progressions

In mathematics and engineering
 Aircraft principal axes, the axes of an airplane in flight
 Yaw, pitch, and roll, a specific kind of Euler angles